Robert P. Regan (January 4, 1936 – May 3, 1995) was an American politician and businessman.

Regan was born in Chicago, Illinois. He went to Thornton Community College and to Illinois Wesleyan University. Regan was involved with the insurance business. He was also worked as a supervisor for the Illinois Department of Insurance. Regan served on the Will County Board and was a vice-chair of the county board. Regan served in the Illinois House of Representatives from 1985 to 1993 and was a Republican. He died at his home in Crete, Illinois.

Notes

1936 births
1995 deaths
Businesspeople from Chicago
Politicians from Chicago
Illinois Wesleyan University alumni
County board members in Illinois
Republican Party members of the Illinois House of Representatives
20th-century American politicians
20th-century American businesspeople